The 2009 Salzburg state election was held on 1 March 2009 to elect the members of the Landtag of Salzburg.

The Social Democratic Party of Austria (SPÖ) remained the largest party but took moderate losses. Its coalition partner the Austrian People's Party (ÖVP) also suffered a small swing against it. The Freedom Party of Austria (FPÖ) recovered somewhat from its 2004 defeat, winning five seats. The Greens remained stable. The SPÖ renewed its coalition with the ÖVP, and Governor Gabi Burgstaller was re-elected for a second term.

Background
In the 2004 election, the SPÖ became the largest party in the Landtag for the first time in post-war history. While the ÖVP suffered only a slight decline, they fell to second place in the face of a major swing to the SPÖ, who captured voters from the FPÖ and Liberal Forum. The FPÖ fell from 20% to under 9%, while the Greens made gains. Gabi Burgstaller subsequently became the first SPÖ governor of Salzburg, in a coalition with the ÖVP.

Electoral system
The 36 seats of the Landtag of Salzburg are elected via open list proportional representation in a two-step process. The seats are distributed between six multi-member constituencies. For parties to receive any representation in the Landtag, they must either win at least one seat in a constituency directly, or clear a 5 percent state-wide electoral threshold. Seats are distributed in constituencies according to the Hare quota, with any remaining seats allocated using the D'Hondt method at the state level, to ensure overall proportionality between a party's vote share and its share of seats.

Contesting parties
The table below lists parties represented in the previous Landtag.

In addition to the parties already represented in the Landtag, one party collected enough signatures to be placed on the ballot:

 Alliance for the Future of Austria (BZÖ)

Results

Results by constituency

References

2009 elections in Austria
State elections in Austria
March 2009 events in Europe